Chico Bento – Pavor Espaciar (Chuck Billy - Space Dread) is a 2013 Brazilian graphic novel written and illustrated by Gustavo Duarte based on the Chuck Billy 'n' Folks characters created by Maurício de Sousa. It is part of the Graphic MSP series of graphic novels based on Maurício de Sousa characters.

Synopsis

It could be just another quiet night in Zucchini's Village. But Chuck Billy, his cousin Zeke,  Pork Chop and chicken Ma Megg were strangely abducted by aliens who have sinister plans.

References

2013 graphic novels
Brazilian graphic novels
Adventure graphic novels
Monica's Gang